Akodia railway station is a railway station in Shajapur district of Madhya Pradesh. Its code is AKD. It serves Akodia town. The station consists of two platforms. It lacks many facilities including water and sanitation. Passenger, Express and Superfast trains halt here.

References

Railway stations in Shajapur district
Ratlam railway division